"Plain Jane" is a 1966 Australian TV movie. It stars Elspeth Ballantyne and was produced by Oscar Whitbread for the ABC.

It was based on a TV play which had been performed by the BBC in 1963.

Plot
A man, Martin (Martin Magee), gets cold feet on the evening of his wedding to Kathleen. His friends give him advice, including a married couple, Adrian and Myrtle, but he is forced to make his own decision.

Cast
Elspeth Ballantyne as Kathleen
Martin Magee as Martin
Stanley Walsh as Adrian
Syd Conabere
Marcus Cooney
Marion Edward
Rosemary Gerrette
Brian Hannan
Joan Harris
Paul Karo
Gerard Kennedy
John Llewellyn
Joy Mitchell as Myrtle
David Telford

Production
It was written by a Belfast school teacher. The play was performed on the BBC two years earlier by Eric Taylor who since joined the ABC. The play was filmed in Melbourne.

References

External links
 

1966 television plays
1966 Australian television episodes
1960s Australian television plays
Wednesday Theatre (season 2) episodes